Peski-Kharkovskiye is a rural locality (a settlement) in Krinichenskoye Rural Settlement, Ostrogozhsky District, Voronezh Oblast, Russia. The population was 92 as of 2010. There are 4 streets.

Geography 
Peski-Kharkovskiye is located 29 km northeast of Ostrogozhsk (the district's administrative centre) by road. Luki is the nearest rural locality.

References 

Rural localities in Ostrogozhsky District